The women's finweight (49 kilograms) event at the 2014 Asian Games took place on 30 September 2014 at Ganghwa Dolmens Gymnasium, Incheon, South Korea.

A total of sixteen competitors from sixteen countries competed in this event, limited to fighters whose body weight was less than 49 kilograms.

Chanatip Sonkham of Thailand won the gold medal after defeating Li Zhaoyi of China in the gold medal match 7–4.

Schedule
All times are Korea Standard Time (UTC+09:00)

Results 
Legend
P — Won by punitive declaration

References

External links
Official website

Taekwondo at the 2014 Asian Games